Tokachi International Speedway (十勝インターナショナルスピードウェイ) is a motor racing circuit in Takikubo, Sarabetsu, Hokkaido, Japan.

The circuit has two main configurations, the Grand Prix Course (グランプリコース), and the Clubman Course (クラブマンコース), .

Events
Starting in 1994, there was a 24-hour N1 class race in July each year until 2008. In 2007, a Toyota Supra took the first win for a hybrid vehicle.

In 2004, a regular All Japan Grand Touring Car Championship race was held at the Clubman Course. And also a regular Formula Nippon race in 1995 and 1996 were held at the Grand Prix Course. In 2018 the D1 Grand Prix series held a regular race at the circuit.

The track is also used by the Renault Eurocup, and for karting.

Lap records

The unofficial all-time track record set during a race weekend is 1:39.625, set by Toranosuke Takagi in a Reynard 96D, during the qualifying for the 1996 Tokachi Formula Nippon round. The official lap record for the current circuit layout is 1:41.100, set by Michael Krumm during the same race. The official race lap records at the Tokachi International Speedway are listed as:

Notes

References

External links
Tokachi International Speedway Official site (Japanese)

Motorsport venues in Japan
Sports venues in Hokkaido
Sports venues completed in 1993
1993 establishments in Japan